West Worthing railway station is in Worthing in the county of West Sussex, England. It is  down the line from Brighton. The station is operated by Southern.

History 

Historically, the station was planned to be the southern terminus of a new line running from the Midlands to the South Coast, and delivering holidaymakers to the new town of West Worthing; it was consequently built near the northern end of Grand Avenue, which runs from the station to the sea. The line was never constructed.

The station was built by J.T. Firbank and opened on 4 November 1889. It was expanded by the addition of a large goods yard in 1905 which catered for the produce of the large number of market gardens in the area, but by 1932 part of the yard was given over to the carriage sheds which, until mid-2008, stood to the west of the station.

In January 2008 demolition of the former depot building began. The building was removed because of asbestos and poor condition of the structure.

Incidents

On 19 November 2020, a Southern Class 313 EMU numbered 313220 caught fire on platform 2 of the station. No one was injured.

On 1 February 2022, the driver of an out-of-service Class 313 EMU waiting in the siding to the west of the station was struck and killed by a Southern Class 377 EMU approaching the station. Investigations by the Rail Accident Investigation Branch concluded that the driver had likely left the safety of his cab to urinate, as Class 313 trains do not have on-board toilets. The RAIB recommended that Govia Thameslink Railway should review staff toilet facilities on its routes, and ensure that staff are aware of these facilities and have sufficient time to use them.

Services 
Off-peak, all services at West Worthing are operated by Southern using  EMUs.

The typical off-peak service in trains per hour is:

 2 tph to  via 
 1 tph to 
 2 tph to 
 1 tph to 

During the peak hours, the station is served by a small number of direct trains between Brighton and Littlehampton, and between Brighton and Portsmouth Harbour.

References

External links 

Buildings and structures in Worthing
Railway stations in West Sussex
DfT Category D stations
Former London, Brighton and South Coast Railway stations
Railway stations in Great Britain opened in 1889
Railway stations served by Govia Thameslink Railway